"Gleanntáin Ghlas' Ghaoth Dobhair" is a song in the Irish language  written by Irish musician Proinsias Ó Maonaigh (father of Mairéad Ní Mhaonaigh of Altan)  about his hometown of Gaoth Dobhair in County Donegal. It translates as "the green glens of Gweedore". The song is one of the well-known Irish language songs of Ireland and it can be heard in many Irish pubs around the world.

Renditions
 Altan's version of the song appears on their 1997 album Runaway Sunday. 
 Irish singer Paul Brady has recorded the song on numerous occasions. 
 Scottish folk group Battlefield Band popularised the song as "Paddy's Green Shamrock Shore" (which they recorded and released in 1976 on their debut album Farewell to Nova Scotia).

References

Culture in Gweedore
Irish folk songs
Irish-language songs
Year of song missing